Marvin Leland Johnson (April 13, 1927 – February 8, 1981) was a player in the National Football League.

Biography
Johnson was born Marvin Leland Johnson on April 13, 1927 in Orange, California. He died in Palo Alto in 1981.

Career
Johnson played with the Los Angeles Rams during the 1951 NFL season. He later played with the Green Bay Packers during the 1953 NFL season after having split the previous season between the Rams and the Packers.

He played at the collegiate level at San Jose State University.

See also
List of Green Bay Packers players

References

1927 births
1981 deaths
Players of American football from San Francisco
Los Angeles Rams players
Green Bay Packers players
San Jose State Spartans football players